Alessandro Besozzi (born 22 July 1702 in Parma – died 26 July 1793 in Turin) was an Italian composer and virtuoso oboist. He was a member of the ducal Guardia Irlandese from 1714, a hautboy band created by Antonio Farnese, Duke of Parma in 1702, where he worked with his father Cristoforo Besozzi and his brothers Giuseppe and Paolo Girolamo Besozzi. After leaving the company on 20 April 1731, he worked in Turin with his brother Paolo Girolamo at the court of Charles Emmanuel III of Sardinia.

The uncle of Antonio Besozzi and Gaetano Besozzi, he played concerts in various European cities with his younger brother Paolo. They went to Paris to play in the Concert Spirituel from 30 March to 29 May 1735, taking part for a time in the musical chapel of Versailles. He also gave singing lessons, met many important personalities of the musical world throughout Europe, and had many students who became successful musicians themselves like Johann Christian Fischer and Georg Druschetzky.

Works
Alessandro Besozzi is the author of nearly two hundred chamber works composed for various groups of instruments, although only one of them was published in his lifetime. He wrote over a hundred sonatas, 65 trios, six oboe concertos, two for flute, and twelve trio sonatas. 

 6 Trio sonatas for flute, viola with basso continuo for harp or cello (London, 1747)
 12 Sonatas for two oboes (composed together with his brother Paolo Girolamo)
 6 pieces for flute, oboe and viola, Op. 2 (Paris, 1740)
 6 sonatas for 2 violas and basso continuo for harp, Op. 4 (London, 1760)
 6 sonatas for 2 violas or 2 flutes with basso continuo, Op. 5 (London, 1764)
 6 Suonate mises au jour per Canavasse
 6 sonatas for viola solo and basso continuo
 12 Trios for 2 transverse flutes and harpsichord
 Sonata a 2 for oboe and basso
 Trii delli Sig.ri Fratelli Besuzzi di Torino for 2 flutes con basso
 Sonata a tre for transverse flute, viola and basso
 8 Sonatas for 2 violas and cello
 Trio for 2 violas with basso
 6 Trios for 2 violas and cello
 Sonata da camera for 2 violas and basso
 6 Sonatas for 2 violas and basso
 Canzonette for soprano with basso
 Sonata a tre for 2 violas and basso
 Trio for 2 transverse flutes or viola and basso
 2 Sonata da camera
 6 Trios for 2 violas or oboe instead of the first violin and basso
 Sonata in B-flat major for trombone and piano
 6 pieces for flute, oboe or viola, with basso continuo for harp or cello, Op. 3 (London, 1750)

Notes

References

External links
Biography of the Besozzi musicians in Italian

1702 births
1793 deaths
18th-century Italian composers
18th-century Italian male musicians
Italian Baroque composers
Italian male classical composers
Italian classical oboists
Male oboists
People from Piacenza